Monarchism in France is the advocacy of restoring the monarchy (mostly constitutional monarchy) in France, which was abolished after the 1870 defeat by Prussia, arguably before that in 1848 with the establishment of the French Second Republic.
The French monarchist movements are roughly divided today in three groups:

The Legitimists for the royal House of Bourbon, 
the Orléanists for the cadet branch of the House of Orléans, and 
the Bonapartists for the imperial House of Bonaparte

History 
In France, Louis Philippe abdicated on February 24, 1848, opening way to the Second Republic (1848–1852), which lasted until Napoleon III's December 2, 1851 coup d'état and the establishment of the Second Empire (1852–1870). The monarchist movement came back into force only after the 1870 defeat by Prussia and the crushing of the 1871 Paris Commune by Orléanist Adolphe Thiers. Legitimists and Orléanists controlled the majority of the Assemblies, and supported Patrice de MacMahon, Duke of Magenta, as president of the Ordre moral government. 

But the intransigeance of the Count of Chambord, who refused to abandon the white flag and its fleur-de-lis against the republican tricolore, and the 16 May 1877 crisis forced the legitimists to abandon the political arena, while some of the more liberal Orléanists "rallied" throughout years to the Third Republic (1870–1940). However, since the monarchy and Catholicism were long entangled ("the alliance of the Throne and the Altar"), republican ideas were often tinged with anti-clericalism, which led to some turmoil during Radical Émile Combes' cabinet in the beginning of the 20th century.

Concerns about monarchists caused the French government to bury the Unknown Soldier of World War I at the Arc de Triomphe, because the Panthéon was associated with the Republic. The Action Française, founded in 1898 during the Dreyfus affair, remained an influential far right movement throughout the 1930s, taking part in the February 6, 1934 riots. Some monarchists, such as Georges Valois who founded the Faisceau, became involved in fascism after the 1926 Papal condemnation of the Action Française by Pius XI.

Monarchists were then active under the Vichy regime, with the leader of the Action Française Charles Maurras qualifying as "divine surprise" the overthrow of the Republic and the arrival to power of Marshal Pétain. A few of them, such as Henri d'Astier de la Vigerie, took part in the Resistance out of patriotic concerns. The Action Française was then dissolved after the war, but Maurice Pujo founded it again in 1947.

Some legitimists had become involved in the traditionalist Catholic movement which arose in the aftermath of the Second Vatican Council and some ultimately followed the 1970 foundation of the traditionalist Catholic Society of Saint Pius X by Marcel Lefebvre. Bertrand Renouvin made a breakaway movement from the Action Française in 1971, the Nouvelle Action Française which became the Nouvelle Action Royaliste, while some legitimists joined Jean-Marie Le Pen's Front National, founded in 1972.

Current pretenders

The most recognised pretenders to the French throne are Prince Jean, Count of Paris for the Orléanists; Louis Alphonse, Duke of Anjou for the Legitimists; and Jean-Christophe, Prince Napoléon for the Bonapartists.

Monarchist groups 
Monarchism continues to exist in France. The historian Julian T. Jackson wrote in 2001 that "Indeed in the Vendée there are still families today who will not receive descendants of people who bought biens nationaux during the Revolution." Falling into one of the three main monarchist streams, some of the active groups in France today are:

 Action Française
 Alliance Royale
 Nouvelle Action Royaliste

References

External links 
Union des Cercles Légitimistes de France.org
monarchie française.fr (UCLF)
Cercle Henri IV
Alliance Royale
Action Française
Rassemblement Démocrate
Nouvelle Action royaliste
La Restauration Nationale
Vive le Roy.fr (UCLF)
Légitimistes of Lorraine
 French Royalist